A Gift is the second Christmas album by Canadian country music singer Paul Brandt.  It won the 2007 Gospel Music Association of Canada Covenant Award for Seasonal Album of the Year, while the title song "A Gift" won the Seasonal Song of the Year award. The track "Christmas Convoy" is a reworked version of Brandt's cover of C. W. McCall's "Convoy".

Track listing

 "Let It Snow" (Sammy Cahn, Jule Styne) – 3:00
 "A Gift" (Paul Brandt) – 2:50
 "White Christmas" (Irving Berlin) – 3:25
 "Christmas Convoy" (P. Brandt, Chip Davis, Bill Fries) – 4:43
 "Hands" (P. Brandt, Liz Brandt) – 4:33
 "Go Tell It on the Mountain" (Public domain) – 4:52
 "I'll Be Home for Christmas" (Kim Gannon, Walter Kent, Buck Ram) – 3:51
 "Winter Wonderland" (Felix Bernard, Richard B. Smith) – 2:57
 "Mary, Did You Know?" (Buddy Greene, Mark Lowry) – 3:30
 "We Three Kings" (Reverend John H. Hopkins Jr.) – 5:36

References

External links
 A Gift review at Soulshine. Retrieved June 6, 2009.

Paul Brandt albums
2006 Christmas albums
Christmas albums by Canadian artists
Country Christmas albums